Marcus Junkelmann (born 2 October 1949 in Munich) is a German historian and experimental archeologist.

Life and work
Junkelmann started to study history at Ludwig Maximilian University of Munich in 1971 and in 1979 he received a PhD for a thesis on the military achievements of Maximilian II (1662–1726) (original title:  Kurfürst Max Emanuel von Bayern als Feldherr). After that he worked as an associate member of staff at the university and for a military museum in Ingolstadt.

In the 1980s Junkelmann became well known in Germany for his work in experimental archeology. He reconstructed and tested Roman weapons and army gear. In 1985 in connection with the 2000 year celebration of the city of Augsburg he organized a large experimental reenactment of the life and work conditions of Roman legionaries. The experiment consisted of a month-long march from Verona to Augsburg including a crossing of the Alps. For the complete trip the original Roman army gear and equipment was used and the typical legionary tasks were performed. Later Junkelmann went on to perform a similar experiments for the Roman cavalry. He authored several books and documentaries on his archeological experiments. In 1997 he was awarded the Ceram Prize for his book on the nutrition of Roman soldiers (original title: Panis militaris: Die Ernährung des römischen Soldaten oder der Grundstoff der Macht).

Works

Books & Papers
 Kurfürst Max Emanuel von Bayern als Feldherr, (Dissertation von 1979), Herbert Utz Verlag, München 2000 
 Napoleon und Bayern. Von den Anfängen des Königreiches, Pustet, Regensburg 1984 
 Die Legionen des Augustus. Der römische Soldat im archäologischen Experiment, Verlag Philipp von Zabern, Mainz 1986 (Kulturgeschichte der antiken Welt, Bd. 33) 
 Morgenröte am Potomac: Der amerikanische Bürgerkrieg, Schweizer Verlagshaus, Zürich 1987 
 Nach dem Sturm: Aufbruch einer Nation: Die USA nach dem Bürgerkrieg, Schweizer Verlagshaus, Zürich 1990, 
 Die Reiter Roms. Teil 1, Reise, Jagd, Triumph und Circusrennen, von Zabern, Mainz 1990 (Kulturgeschichte der antiken Welt, Bd. 45)  (Neuauflage 2008)
 Die Reiter Roms. Teil 2, Der militärische Einsatz, von Zabern, Mainz 1991 (Kulturgeschichte der antiken Welt, Bd. 49)  (Neuauflage 2008)
 Die Reiter Roms. Teil 3, Zubehör, Reitweise, Bewaffnung, von Zabern, Mainz 1992 (Kulturgeschichte der antiken Welt, Bd. 53)  (Neuauflage 2008)
 Der amerikanische Bürgerkrieg 1861 - 1865, Weltbild-Verlag, Augsburg 1992 
 Die Eroberung des Westens. Die USA nach dem Bürgerkrieg 1865 - 1890, Weltbild-Verlag, Augsburg 1993 
 Gustav Adolf (1594-1632): Schwedens Aufstieg zur Großmacht, Pustet, Regensburg, 1993 
 Dollinger - Das Buch zum Spiel, Verlag der Mittelbayerischen Zeitung, Regensburg, 1995
 Reiter wie Statuen aus Erz, Verlag Philipp von Zabern, Mainz 1996 (Zaberns Bildbände zur Archäologie / Antike Welt, Sonderband) 
 Panis militaris. Die Ernährung des römischen Soldaten oder der Grundstoff der Macht, Verlag Philipp von Zabern, Mainz 1997 (Kulturgeschichte der antiken Welt, Bd. 75) 
 Römische Helme (mit Beiträgen von John Pollini und Günther E. Thüry, hrsg. von Hermann Born), Sammlung Axel Guttmann, Verlag Philipp von Zabern, Mainz 2000 
 Römische Kampf- und Turnierrüstungen, Sammlung Axel Guttmann (zusammen mit Hermann Born), Verlag Philipp von Zabern, Mainz 1997 
 Arte & Marte Theatrum belli. Die Schlacht bei Höchstädt 1704 und die Schlösser von Schleißheim und Blenheim, Bautz, Traugott, Herzfeld 2000 
 Aus dem Füllhorn Roms. 34 Originalrezepte aus der römischen Küche, Verlag Philipp von Zabern, Mainz 2000 
 Das Spiel mit dem Tod. So kämpften Roms Gladiatoren, Verlag Philipp von Zabern, Mainz 2000 (Zaberns Bildbände zur Archäologie)  (Neuauflage 2008)
 Hollywoods Traum von Rom. "Gladiator" und die Tradition des Monumentalfilms, von Verlag Philipp von Zabern, Mainz 2004 (Kulturgeschichte der antiken Welt, Bd. 94) 
 Das greulichste Spectaculum. Die Schlacht von Höchstädt 1704. Hefte zur Bayerischen Geschichte und Kultur Bd. 30,  hrsg. vom Haus der Bayerischen Geschichte 2004, 
 Was ist was: Gladiatoren. Kämpfer der Arena (für Kinder), Tessloff Verlag, Nürnberg 2005

Video documentaries
  Bilder aus der deutschen Vergangenheit. Der deutsche Soldat (Bayerischer Rundfunk, 1986 – zahlreiche Wiederholungen)
  Der Römerschatz von Sorviodurum. Das Gäubodenmuseum Straubing (Landesstelle für die nichtstaatlichen Museen/Bayerischer Rundfunk, 1994)
  Gerichte mit Geschichte. Römische Küche im alten Bayern. Film von Werner Teufl und Dr. Marcus Junkelmann (Bayerisches Fernsehen, 2000 – auch als Video)

References 

 Interview mit Dr. Marcus Junkelmann. Official website of the town of Dewangen (Aalen), 2012 (German)
Bayerischer Verdienstorden für Junkelmann at schleissheimer-zeitung.de, 2012-10-10 (German)
Marcus Junkelmann. Website of Wilfried Stroh, professor emeritus of the Ludwig Maximilian University of Munich

External links

personal website

German military historians
Archaeologists from Bavaria
Experimental archaeology
1949 births
Living people
German male non-fiction writers